Hopewell is an unincorporated community in Clay County, Mississippi, United States.

References

Unincorporated communities in Clay County, Mississippi
Unincorporated communities in Mississippi